Les Wicks (born 15 June 1955) is an Australian poet, publisher and editor. He has published more than fifteen books of poetry.

Early life and education
Wicks grew up in the western suburbs of Sydney. He studied for a Bachelor of Arts in History at Macquarie University and worked at a variety of unskilled and semi-skilled jobs while living in Sydney and London.

In the late 1970s, he established Meuse publications (with Bill Farrow) which mixed text and graphics. He helped set up the Poets Union in NSW. From the 1980s, he worked as a union industrial advocate for several unions after obtaining a Graduate Diploma in Industrial Law from the University of Sydney.

Selected bibliography
 The Vanguard Sleeps In  (Glandular, 1981)
Cannibals  (Rochford Street Press, 1985)
Tickle  (Island Press, 1993)
Nitty Gritty (Five Islands, 1997)
The Ways of Waves (Sidewalk, 2000)
Appetites of Light (Presspress, 2002)
Stories of the Feet (Five Islands, 2004)
The Ambrosiacs (Island Press, 2009)
Shadows of the Read  (Krok, 2011), 2011) English/Ukrainian
Barking Wings (PressPress, 2012), 2012)
 Sea of Heartbeak (Unexpected Resilience) (Puncher & Wattmann, 2013)
 El Asombrado (On-line ebook) (Rochford Street Press, 2015) English/Spanish
Getting By Not Fitting In  (Island Press, 2016)
Belief (Flying Islands, 2019)
Time Taken - New and Selected (Puncher & Wattmann 2022)

As editor/co-editor or organised
2022 * Guide to Sydney Crime Meuse Press
2018 * "To End All Wars" (Puncher & Wattmann, 2018)
2015 *Guide to Sydney Rivers Meuse Press
2011 "AU/UA: Contemporary Poetry of Ukraine and Australia" (Krok, 2011) Meuse Press
2010 "from this Broken Hill" Meuse Press
2009 *Guide to Sydney Beaches Meuse Press
2000–2008 co-organiser Poets on Wheels.
2002 Heritage Light including publishing a poem on the surface of a river.
1998–2003 Written in Sand Project Meuse Press.
1999–2000 editor of Hobo.
1993 to date director of Island Press.
1992–1999 Artransit Project Meuse Press.
1985 Musicians Union Band Guide. 1978.
1984–1997 to Senior Industrial Officer Musicians Union & Media Entertainment & Arts Alliance.
1990–93 Sec. NSW ALP Communications & Leisure Policy Committee. –
1977–1981 Meuse Press Magazine, supplements & anthologies.
Part of PUA Poets Union of Australia (NSW) original steering committee, Jnt Sec./Treas. (1979–80), Federal Secretary 1983.

Notes

References
Australian Artists & Writers Directory Les Wicks – Biographical Note
Directory of Australian Poets 1980 Poets Union
Guide to Sydney Beaches
from this Broken Hill
AU/UA Contemporary Poetry of Ukraine and Australia
Meuse Press
Festival Internacional de Poesia de Medellin
 Review of "Stories of the Feet"
 " review Belief
 Puncher and Wattmann
Les Wicks website

External links
 
 Review of "Stories of the Feet"
 Review of "Barking Wings"
 El Asombrado"

1955 births
Australian poets
English-language poets
Living people
Australian magazine publishers (people)
Macquarie University alumni
University of Sydney alumni